In calculus, the constant of integration, often denoted by  (or ), is a constant term added to an antiderivative of a function  to indicate that the indefinite integral of  (i.e., the set of all antiderivatives of ), on a connected domain, is only defined up to an additive constant. This constant expresses an ambiguity inherent in the construction of antiderivatives.

Origin

The derivative of any constant function is zero. Once one has found one antiderivative  for a function , adding or subtracting any constant  will give us another antiderivative, because . The constant is a way of expressing that every function with at least one antiderivative will have an infinite number of them.

Let  and  be two everywhere differentiable functions. Suppose that  for every real number x. Then there exists a real number  such that  for every real number x.

To prove this, notice that .

Choose a real number , and let . For any x, the fundamental theorem of calculus, together with the assumption that the derivative of  vanishes, implying that 

 

thereby showing that  is a constant function.

Two facts are crucial in this proof. First, the real line is connected. If the real line were not connected, we would not always be able to integrate from our fixed a to any given x. For example, if we were to ask for functions defined on the union of intervals [0,1] and [2,3], and if a were 0, then it would not be possible to integrate from 0 to 3, because the function is not defined between 1 and 2. Here, there will be two constants, one for each connected component of the domain. In general, by replacing constants with locally constant functions, we can extend this theorem to disconnected domains.

 

As an example, let  be the Heaviside step function, which is zero for negative values of x and one for non-negative values of x, and let . As an example, take  to be the Cantor function and again let .

It turns out that adding and subtracting constants is the only flexibility we have in finding different antiderivatives of the same function. That is, all antiderivatives are the same up to a constant.

Replacing  by a number will produce an antiderivative. It is easily determined that all of these functions are indeed antiderivatives of :

Necessity

At first glance, it may seem that the constant is unnecessary, since it can be set to zero. Furthermore, when evaluating definite integrals using the fundamental theorem of calculus, the constant will always cancel with itself.

However, trying to set the constant to zero does not always make sense.  For example,  can be integrated in at least three different ways:

So setting  to zero can still leave a constant. This means that, for a given function, there is no "simplest antiderivative".

Another problem with setting  equal to zero is that sometimes we want to find an antiderivative that has a given value at a given point (as in an initial value problem). For example, to obtain the antiderivative of  that has the value 100 at x = π, then only one value of  will work (in this case ).

This restriction can be rephrased in the language of differential equations. Finding an indefinite integral of a function  is the same as solving the differential equation . Any differential equation will have many solutions, and each constant represents the unique solution of a well-posed initial value problem. Imposing the condition that our antiderivative takes the value 100 at x = π is an initial condition.

There is another justification, coming from abstract algebra. The space of all (suitable) real-valued functions on the real numbers is a vector space, and the differential operator  is a linear operator. The operator  maps a function to zero if and only if that function is constant. The process of indefinite integration amounts to finding a pre-image of a given function. There is no canonical pre-image for a given function, but the set of all such pre-images forms a coset. Choosing a constant is the same as choosing an element of the coset. In this context, solving an initial value problem is interpreted as lying in the hyperplane given by the initial conditions.

References

Integral calculus